Kieran James Kennedy (born 23 September 1993) is an English footballer who plays as a defender for  club Stockport Town. He is the grandson of Paddy Kennedy.

A former England under-19 international, he began his career in the academies at Manchester City and Leicester City, before signing with Scottish Premiership side Motherwell in July 2015. He left the club to join AFC Fylde in March 2017, before moving on to Macclesfield Town four months later. He won the National League title with Macclesfield during the 2017–18 season, and was bought by Shrewsbury Town in June 2018. He failed to break into the first-team with Shrewsbury however, and was allowed to sign with Wrexham in January 2019, before he returned to the English Football League with Port Vale in June 2019. However he returned to Wrexham on loan in November 2019. He was released by Port Vale and went on to sign with York City in August 2020, Macclesfield in June 2021 and then Stockport Town in September 2021.

Club career

Early career
Kennedy started his career at Manchester City, and spent a total of 14 years at the club's Academy. He was given the squad number 54 by manager Roberto Mancini for the 2012–13 season. He joined Leicester City on loan during the 2013–14 season, mainly playing in their under-21 squad, before he was signed by manager Nigel Pearson permanently in the summer. He was released by Leicester after the "Foxes" retained their Premier League place at the end of the 2014–15 season.

Motherwell
Kennedy initially joined Motherwell on a trial basis, but impressed in pre-season games against Borussia Mönchengladbach and SC Heerenveen to convince boss Ian Baraclough to sign him on a two-year deal on 16 July 2015; in doing so Kennedy rejected the offer of a trial game at Southend United. Kennedy made his first-ever start in competitive football in the Scottish League Cup, in a 3–1 extra-time win at East Fife on 25 August. He made his first league start four days later, in a 1–0 victory over Kilmarnock at Fir Park. Stephen McManus remained first-choice centre-back under new manager Mark McGhee, whilst Kennedy competed with Louis Laing and Ben Hall to play alongside him. He went on to feature 25 times for the "Well" during the 2015–16 season, helping the club to a fifth-place finish in the Scottish Premiership. However he did not make a first-team appearance during the 2016–17 campaign after struggling with illness and injuries and left the club by mutual consent in March 2017 after he asked to leave the "Steelmen" in order to find first-team football elsewhere.

AFC Fylde
On 23 March 2017, Kennedy returned to England and joined National League North side AFC Fylde. He made two substitute appearances for Dave Challinor's "Coasters" as Fylde secured promotion as league champions at the end of the 2016–17 season.

Macclesfield Town
On 21 July 2017, Kennedy signed a one-year contract with National League side Macclesfield Town after impressing during a trial game against Derby County. He scored his first competitive goal in a 2–0 win at Chester City on 28 August. He helped the "Silkmen" to keep a total of 14 clean sheets in his 35 appearances as Macclesfield won promotion to the English Football League as champions of the National League in 2017–18. Manager John Askey said that "it took us about six months to get him properly fit because he had been out ill for six months, but once he was fit he was a completely different player who has got a lot of ability".

Shrewsbury Town
On 10 June 2018, Kennedy followed John Askey out of Moss Rose and signed for League One side Shrewsbury Town on a one-year deal; Shrewsbury paid Macclesfield an undisclosed fee. He left the New Meadow after being released on 10 January 2019 as new "Shrews" manager Sam Ricketts preferred Mat Sadler, Omar Beckles and Luke Waterfall ahead of him.

Wrexham
On 10 January 2019, Kennedy signed a six-month contract with Wrexham. With Manny Smith and Doug Tharme injured, leaving only Shaun Pearson and Jake Lawlor available at centre-back, manager Graham Barrow said that "it gives us depth and would also allow us to play with three at the back if needs be." He made 13 appearances for the "Red Dragons" in the second half of the 2018–19 season, scoring goals against Barrow and Sutton United at the Racecourse Ground. Wrexham qualified for the National League play-off quarter-finals, but Kennedy had a goal ruled out as Wrexham were beaten 1–0 by Eastleigh; manager Bryan Hughes disagreed with the officials, saying "it was definitely a goal". Kennedy was offered a new deal at the end of the season, however chose to reject it.

Port Vale
On 3 June 2019, Kennedy joined League Two side Port Vale on a one-year deal. Having coached Kennedy at Macclesfield and Shrewsbury, manager John Askey said that he would provide competition for established centre-backs Nathan Smith and Leon Legge. He scored an own goal on his debut for the "Valiants" on 3 September, in 2–1 victory over Shrewsbury Town in an EFL Trophy tie at Vale Park. He also scored an own goal on his league debut on 17 September, as Vale fell to a 2–0 at league leaders Exeter City. Having failed to break into the first-team at Vale, he rejoined Wrexham on loan on 20 November. The loan deal was later extended until the end of the 2019–20 season. He was released by Port Vale at the end of the season.

York City
On 13 August 2020, Kennedy joined National League North side York City on a one-year deal; he had previously worked under manager Steve Watson at Macclesfield Town. He played seven league games before the 2020–21 season was curtailed early due to the COVID-19 pandemic in England and was not retained at the end of his contract.

Macclesfield
On 4 June 2021, Kennedy was announced as the first signing for the new Macclesfield Town phoenix club Macclesfield. It was announced that he had signed a two-year deal with the North West Counties League Premier Division club. However he featured just five times for Macclesfield.

Stockport Town
On 10 September 2021, Kennedy joined Stockport Town, who were a division below Macclesfield in the North West Counties League Division One South. He was sent off after the final whistle in a 3–1 defeat at Alsager Town. He played a total of 14 games for Stockport Town in the 2021–22 season.

International career
Kennedy has been capped by the England under-19 team.

Style of play
Kennedy is a right-footed left-sided centre-half, who can also play with his left-foot and at left-back, right-back or as a central defensive midfielder. Port Vale manager John Askey described him as a "footballing centre-half" who combined athletic ability with composure on the ball. Macclesfield coach George Pilkington concurred, saying "he's quick, he's strong in the air, he's aggressive and he's got all the ingredients to go on and kick on again".

Personal life
His grandfather, Paddy Kennedy, was one of the "Busby Babes", though only played a handful of games in a seven-year career for Manchester United, Southampton and Blackburn Rovers.

Career statistics

Honours
Macclesfield Town
National League: 2017–18

References

1993 births
Living people
Footballers from Manchester
English people of Irish descent
English footballers
England youth international footballers
Association football defenders
Manchester City F.C. players
Leicester City F.C. players
Motherwell F.C. players
AFC Fylde players
Macclesfield Town F.C. players
Shrewsbury Town F.C. players
Wrexham A.F.C. players
Port Vale F.C. players
York City F.C. players
Macclesfield F.C. players
Stockport Town F.C. players
Scottish Professional Football League players
National League (English football) players
English Football League players
North West Counties Football League players